Westerbach may refer to:

Westerbach (Hasel), a river in Bavaria, Germany, tributary of the Hasel
Westerbach (Kahl), a river in Bavaria, Germany, tributary of the Kahl